Fred Leach (1885–?) was an English professional golfer.  His best performance in the Open Championship, the only major tournament he played in, was a tie for 6th place in 1921. His final score was only six shots shy of the pace set by Jock Hutchison and Roger Wethered who tied for first place and went to a playoff in which Hutchison prevailed.

Early life
Leach was born in 1885 in Baildon, Yorkshire, England.

Golf career
He was an assistant at Bradford Golf Club and while there was the second placed assistant in the 1903 Leeds Cup behind Bertie Snowball. Soon afterwards he moved south and became an assistant to William Fulford at Northwood Golf Club. Leach was joint runner-up in the 1905 Leeds Cup, played at his old club at Bradford, five strokes behind Sandy Herd and tied with Bertie Snowball.

He was at Northwood for 21 years before moving to Highwoods Golf Club at Bexhill-on-Sea when that course opened in 1925 and then became professional at Royal Wimbledon Golf Club from 1926 to 1950, where he replaced William's nephew Jack Fulford.

Leach tied for 6th place in the 1921 Open Championship and reached the final of the 1922 News of the World Match Play at Sunningdale Golf Club, losing 5&4 to George Gadd.

Death
Leach's date of death is unknown.

Results in major championships

Note: Leach only played in The Open Championship.

NT = No tournament
CUT = missed the half-way cut
? = finish unknown
"T" indicates a tie for a place

References

English male golfers
People from Baildon
1885 births
Year of death missing